In complex analysis, given initial data consisting of  points  in the complex unit disc  and target data consisting of  points  in ,  the Nevanlinna–Pick interpolation problem is to find a holomorphic function  that interpolates the data, that is for all ,
,
subject to the constraint  for all .

Georg Pick and Rolf Nevanlinna solved the problem independently in 1916 and 1919 respectively, showing that an interpolating function exists if and only if a matrix defined in terms of the initial and target data is positive semi-definite.

Background
The Nevanlinna–Pick theorem represents an -point generalization of the Schwarz lemma. The invariant form of the Schwarz lemma states that for a holomorphic function , for all ,

Setting , this inequality is equivalent to the statement that the matrix given by

that is the Pick matrix is positive semidefinite.

The Nevanlinna–Pick theorem
The Nevanlinna–Pick theorem states the following. Given , there exists a holomorphic function  such that  if and only if the Pick matrix

is positive semi-definite. Furthermore, the function  is unique if and only if the Pick matrix has zero determinant. In this case,  is a Blaschke product, with degree equal to the rank of the Pick matrix (except in the trivial case where
all the 's are the same).

Generalisation
The generalization of the Nevanlinna–Pick theorem became an area of active research in operator theory following the work of Donald Sarason on the Sarason interpolation theorem. Sarason gave a new proof of the Nevanlinna–Pick theorem using Hilbert space methods in terms of operator contractions. Other approaches were developed in the work of L. de Branges, and B. Sz.-Nagy and C. Foias.

It can be shown that the Hardy space H 2 is a reproducing kernel Hilbert space, and that its reproducing kernel (known as the Szegő kernel) is

Because of this, the Pick matrix can be rewritten as

This description of the solution has motivated various attempts to generalise Nevanlinna and Pick's result.

The Nevanlinna–Pick problem can be generalised to that of finding a holomorphic function  that interpolates a given set of data, where R is now an arbitrary region of the complex plane.

M. B. Abrahamse showed that if the boundary of R consists of finitely many analytic curves (say n + 1), then an interpolating function f exists if and only if

is a positive semi-definite matrix, for all  in the n-torus. Here, the s are the reproducing kernels corresponding to a particular set of reproducing kernel Hilbert spaces, which are related to the set R. It can also be shown that f is unique if and only if one of the Pick matrices has zero determinant.

Notes

 Pick's original proof concerned functions with positive real part. Under a linear fractional Cayley transform, his result holds on maps from the disc to the disc.

 Pick–Nevanlinna interpolation was introduced into robust control by Allen Tannenbaum.

References

Interpolation